Vahrenwald-List (Eastphalian: Fahrnwoole-List) is the second district of Hanover. With 71,173 inhabitants (2020), it is the most populous district of the city consisting of the quarters Vahrenwald (24,986 inh.) and List (46,187 inh.). Since 2011, the SPD politician Irma Walkling-Stehmann holds the district mayor office.

Demographics

References

Boroughs and quarters of Hanover